Maciej Sylwester Maciejewski (born 10 July 1955 in Żyrardów, Poland) is a Polish actor, with roles in many films.

In 1978, Maciejewski graduated from Akademia Teatralna im. Aleksandra Zelwerowicza in Warsaw. His wife, Barbara, was involved in the Teatr Wielki in Warsaw.

Filmography 

Sprawiedliwi .... Piatek (TV, 2 episodes, 2010)
Ranczo .... Solejuk (TV, 41 episodes, 2006–2009, 2011–2016)
Ranczo Wilkowyje (2007) .... Solejuk
Twarzą w twarz .... Prison Doctor (TV, 1 episode, 2007)
Rys (2007) .... Kutyna
Plebania .... Stefan Martyniuk (TV, 22 episodes, 2003–2006)
Boża podszewka. Część druga (2005) (TV)
Skazany na bluesa (2005) .... Sergeant
Stranger (2004)
Ławeczka (2004) .... Stefan, ship captain
Stara baśn. Kiedy słońce było bogiem (2003) .... Bumir
Na dobre i na zle .... Master (TV, 2 episodes, 2003)
Superprodukcja (2003) .... Capt. Bergman
Sfora (2002) (TV) .... Górko
Wiedźmin (2002) (TV) .... Wójt
Kariera Nikosia Dyzmy (2002) .... Director
Money Is Not Everything (2001) .... Maślanka
Wielkie rzeczy: Gra (2000) (TV)
I'm Looking at You, Mary (2000) (TV)
Miasteczko (2000) .... Antoni (TV, unknown episodes)
Love Me and Do Whatever You Want (1998) .... Jordan
13 posterunek .... Urban Guardian (TV, 1 episode, 1998)
Pestka (1995) .... Sanctuary Train Conductor
Calls Controlled (1991) .... Worker
Panny i wdowy (1991)
Po upadku. Sceny z życia nomenklatury (1990) .... Uczestnik polowania
Zmowa (1990) (TV) .... Bogusław Witkowski
Zabić na koncu (1990)
Dekalog (1 episode, 1990)
Opowieść Harleya (1988)
Weryfikacja (1987) .... Cardplayer
Brawo mistrzu (1987) (TV)
Alternatywy 4 .... Bridegroom (TV, 1 episode, 1986)
Siekierezada (1986)
Cuckoo in a Dark Forest (1986) .... Knopke, SS-man
Dlużnicy śmierci (1986) .... Chlop
Miłość z listy przebojów (1985)
07 zgloś się .... Militiaman (TV, 1 episode, 1984)
Kasztelanka (1983) (TV) .... Pastuch Stasiek
Konopielka (1982)
Śpiewy po rosie (1982) .... Bronek
Białe tango .... Edward Radziejewski (TV, 1 episode, 1981)
Bez znieczulenia (1978) (as Maciej Maciejewski) .... Student

Polish dubbing 
 2009: The Courageous Heart of Irena Sendler .... Peter
 2008: Speed Racer
 2007: TMNT
 2007: Ratatouille .... Larousse
 2006: Cars .... Mack
 2005: Herbie: Fully Loaded .... Driver
 2005: Inspector Gadget
 2003: Finding Nemo
 2002: Camelot .... King Arthur
 2000: Help! I'm a Fish .... Shark
 2000: Planescape: Torment
 1999: Król sokołów
 1997: Pokémon
 1987–1990: DuckTales
 1985: The 13 Ghosts of Scooby-Doo
 1983: Looney Tunes .... Foghorn Leghorn
 1973: The Mad Adventures of Rabbi Jacob
 1972–1973: The New Scooby-Doo Movies

References

External links

Polish male film actors
1955 births
Living people
Polish male television actors
Polish male stage actors
Polish male voice actors
People from Żyrardów
Aleksander Zelwerowicz National Academy of Dramatic Art in Warsaw alumni